Chalmers Jack Mackenzie,  (July 10, 1888 – February 26, 1984) was a Canadian civil engineer, chancellor of Carleton University, president of the National Research Council, first president of Atomic Energy of Canada Limited, first president of Atomic Energy Control Board and instrumental in the development of science and engineering education in Canada.

He was born in St. Stephen, New Brunswick, the youngest of six children of James and Janet MacKenzie. He attended Milltown High School, then completed a Bachelor of Engineering at Dalhousie University in 1909.

In 1912 he was hired to develop an engineering program at the University of Saskatchewan. He served in the Canadian Army during World War I (1915-1918). After the war he continued at the University of Saskatchewan until 1932, when he took a leave of absence to supervise public works projects. In 1939 he left Saskatchewan for Ottawa to become president of the National Research Council. In 1943 he received the Sir John Kennedy Medal.

In 1949 he sat on the Royal Commission on National Development in the Arts, Letters and Sciences, the so-called "Massey Commission", one objective of which was developing Canada's system of publicly funded research.

In 1967, he was made a Companion of the Order of Canada. He received honorary degrees from the University of Saskatchewan, the University of British Columbia, the University of Western Ontario, the University of Ottawa, McMaster University, Queen's University, and the University of New Brunswick.

The Mackenzie Engineering Building at Carleton University is named in his honour. The high school in Deep River, Ontario, Mackenzie Community School (formerly C.J. Mackenzie High School), is named in his honour.

References

External links
 [ecanadianencyclopedia.ca/en/article/chalmers-jack-mackenzie Chalmers Jack Mackenzie] at The Canadian Encyclopedia

1888 births
1984 deaths
Canadian civil engineers
Chancellors of Carleton University
Canadian Companions of the Order of St Michael and St George
Companions of the Order of Canada
Fellows of the Royal Society
Fellows of the Royal Society of Canada
Dalhousie University alumni
20th-century Canadian engineers
Academic staff of the University of Saskatchewan
Engineers from Ontario
Engineers from New Brunswick